"Once in a Lifetime" is a song by Gregorian, released as the second single from their 1991 debut album Sadisfaction. The song is sung by the Sisters of Oz (Susana Espelleta and Birgit Freud). The singles were released on both CD format and vinyl in 7" and 12" versions. An exclusive remix named "Summer Mix" only appeared on the vinyl version and was never released on CD format.

The song was later covered by Sarah Brightman, Princessa and in Cantonese by Shirley Kwan.

Track listing
CD single
 "Once in a Lifetime" (Extended Version)
 "Once in a Lifetime" (L.A. Mix)
 "Once in a Lifetime" (Radio Version)

Vinyl
 "Once in a Lifetime" (Extended Version)
 "Once in a Lifetime" (L.A. Mix)
 "Once in a Lifetime" (Summer Mix)

References

1991 songs
1991 singles
Gregorian (band) songs
Song recordings produced by Frank Peterson
Metronome Records singles